
Year 122 (CXXII) was a common year starting on Wednesday (link will display the full calendar) of the Julian calendar. At the time, it was known as the Year of the Consulship of Aviola and Neratius (or, less frequently, year 875 Ab urbe condita). The denomination 122 for this year has been used since the early medieval period, when the Anno Domini calendar era became the prevalent method in Europe for naming years.

Events 
 By place 
 Roman Empire 
 Emperor Hadrian orders that a 73-mile (117-kilometer) wall be built to mark the northern Roman Empire while personally visiting the area. Hadrian's Wall, as it comes to be known, is intended to keep the Caledonians, Picts and other tribes at bay. 
 Vindolanda, a Roman auxiliary fort (castrum) in northern England, is garrisoned by cohort VIIII Batavorum.   
 September 13 – The building of Hadrian's Wall begins.
 Hadrian gives up the territories conquered in Scotland.

 Asia 
 Change of era name from Jianguang (2nd year) to Yanguang of the Chinese Eastern Han Dynasty.

Births

Deaths

References